

QI11A Rat

Empty group

QI11B Mouse

Empty group

QI11C Guinea-pig

Empty group

QI11X Rodents, others

Empty group

References

I11